Villazón Airport  is a high-elevation airport  northwest of the city of Villazón in the Potosí Department of Bolivia. The airport and city are in the southeastern reaches of the Bolivian Altiplano, on the border with Argentina.

See also

Transport in Bolivia
List of airports in Bolivia

References

External links 

OpenStreetMap - Villazón
OurAirports - Villazón
Fallingrain - Villazón Airport

Airports in Potosí Department